Empoascini is a tribe of leafhoppers in the subfamily Typhlocybinae.

Genera 

 Afrasca
 Afroccidens
 Alafrasca
 Alebrasca
 Alebroides
 Amrasca
 Apheliona
 Asepodiva
 Asymmetrasca
 Austroasca
 Badylessa
 Baguoidea
 Chlorita
 Chloroasca
 Circinans
 Daluana
 Dattasca
 Dayus
 Dialecticopteryx
 Dunioa
 Empoasca
 Epignoma
 Faiga
 Ficiana
 Ghauriana
 Goifa
 Habenia
 Heliona
 Helionides
 Homa
 Ifuaria
 Ifugoa
 Ishiharella
 Jacobiasca
 Jacobiella
 Kaila
 Krameriata
 Kufajka
 Kyboasca
 Kybos
 Lankasca
 Lipata
 Lumicella
 Luodianasca
 Luvila
 Matsumurama
 Membranacea
 Nikkotettix
 Nimabanana
 Optya
 Paulomanus
 Pitadava
 Pradama
 Radicafurcus
 Randhawa
 Rawania
 Schizandrasca
 Shumka
 Sikkimasca
 Smyga
 Szara
 Szuletaia
 Theasca
 Treufalka
 Trifida
 Unitra
 Usharia
 Varsha
 Velu
 Wemba
 Wolvletta
 Znana

In synonymy (1): 
 Bhatasca

Check (2): 
 Beamerana
 Matatua

References

External links 

 
Typhlocybinae
Hemiptera tribes